Kuysun is a rural locality (a selo) in Magaramkentsky District, Republic of Dagestan, Russia. The population was 3,197 as of 2010. There are 34 streets.

Geography 
Kuysun is located 188 southeast of Makhachkala. Gilyar and Ledzhet are the nearest rural localities.

Nationalities 
Lezgins live there.

References 

Rural localities in Magaramkentsky District